Also known as muzungu, mlungu, musungu or musongo,  is a Bantu word that means "wanderer" originally pertaining to spirits. The term is currently used in predominantly Swahili speaking nations to refer to white people dating back to 18th century. The noun Mzungu or its variants are used in Kenya, Tanzania, Uganda, Malawi, Rwanda, Burundi, Democratic Republic of the Congo, Comoros, South Africa, Zimbabwe, Mayotte, Zambia and in Northern Madagascar (the word changed to "vozongo" in Malagasy, but locals will still understand the word mzungu) dating back to the 18th century.

Etymology 
Literally translated  meant "someone who roams around" or "wanderer." The term was first used in Africa to describe Arab, Indian and European traders and explorers in the 18th century, apparently because they moved around aimlessly. The term is now used to refer to "someone with white skin" or "white skin", but can be used to refer to all foreigners more generally. The word  in Swahili can also mean someone who speaks English.

The possessive  (or ) translates as "behaving rich". However, in some areas, such as in Rwanda and Burundi, it does not necessarily refer to the colour of one's skin. Traditionally, Europeans were seen to be people of means and rich and so the terminology was extended to denote affluent persons regardless of race. The plural form may be used to confer a respect, such as the use of the term  to refer to individual foreigners in Malawi's Chichewa language. The possessive  (or ) translated literally means "of the wanderers". However it can be used generally for any European language.

Everyday use
 can be used in an affectionate or insulting way. It is used in Kenya, Tanzania, Uganda, Rwanda, Malawi Zimbabwe and Burundi.  It is often called out by children to get the attention of a passerby. For example, in Malawi, it is common for people to use the casual greeting  to individuals or groups of foreigners.

See also
 , similar term in Māori
 Gringo, similar term in Latin American Spanish
 Gweilo, similar term in Cantonese
 Farang, similar term in Persian language
 Louise Linton, self-dubbed ‘angel-haired muzungu’ in her memoirs
 Murzyn, similar term in Polish language to describe a black person

References

External links

"Mzungu! Mzungu! Mzungu! Give me my money" Ugandan experiences from Ian Anderson

Swahili words and phrases
European diaspora in Africa
African people of European descent
Ethnonyms
White culture in Africa